World Urban Forum III was an international UN-Habitat event on urban sustainability, also known as WUF3 (World Urban Forum) and FUM3 (Forum Urbain Mondial). WUF3 was organized by the UN-Habitat and facilitated and funded by the Government of Canada. It was held on 19–23 June 2006 in Vancouver to help solve urgent problems of the world's cities.

Conference objective 
The theme of the third session of the world urban forum was: "Sustainable Cities – Turning Ideas into Action".

"From Ideas to Action" was the intended outcome of the conference.  Officially it was suggested that this conference would be considered a success if every participant took home and implemented at least one new idea.

Global urban context 

Within the next 50 years, two-thirds of the world's population will live in urban areas. As these cities expand, the world community faces the challenge of minimizing the growing poverty crisis and improving the urban poor's access to basic facilities, such as shelter, clean water and sanitation. World Urban Forum 3 brought together thousands of the world's best thinkers on urbanization – experts, decision makers and members of public and private institutions – to zero in on solutions to these key 21st century challenges.

Defining the conference 

Habitat Jam, a three-day international online event, was conceived to set the stage for the WUF3 conference. Seventy actionable ideas were collected through the Jam and were used to define themes and shape discussion topics for delegates attending the forum. Participation in Habitat Jam was open to public and private-sector organizations and individuals around the world with an interest in urban issues.  While the Jam is over the discussions remain available online.

Participation 
Attendance at WUF3 was estimated at 11,418 people registered from more than 100 countries. The number of participants was 9,689 while 1,847 were support staff and volunteers.

The gender ratios were 46.7% female and 52.1% male. Participants identified as Government, Parliamentarians, or Local Authority comprised 3,094 of the participants. The remaining participants were classified as Non-governmental organizations, Private Sector, Professional and Research Institutions, Foundations, Media, Inter-Governmental Organizations, Other Participants, Canada Secretariat and No Affiliation Indicated.

Compared to previous forums there was a notable increase in private sector participation.  Up from 203 to 1,187 private sector participants between WUF2 and WUF3 in Vancouver.

External links 
 World Urban Forum 3
 WUF3 Session Videos in English and French

2006 conferences
2000s in Vancouver
International conferences in Canada
United Nations conferences
Urban planning
Human settlement
Urbanization
2006 in Canada
Canada and the United Nations